A failed state is a state perceived as having failed at some of the basic conditions and responsibilities of a sovereign government.

Failed State or Failed States may also refer to:
Failed States (album), a Propagandhi album
Failed States: The Abuse of Power and the Assault on Democracy, a book by Noam Chomsky